Flávia Nadalutti (born March 18, 1961 in Rio de Janeiro) is a former international butterfly and medley swimmer from Brazil, who participated in a Summer Olympics for her native country.

She was at the 1975 World Aquatics Championships in Cali. She swam in the 4×100-metre medley, where the Brazil's relay, composed by Christiane Paquelet, Flávia Nadalutti, Lucy Burle and Cristina Teixeira, finished 12th with a time of 4:38.75. In the 200-metre butterfly, she finished with a time of 2:28.53, far from her personal best at this moment, the South American record (2:20.10), not going to the finals.

She was at the 1975 Pan American Games, in Mexico City, where she won a bronze medal in the 4×100-metre medley. She also finished 5th in the 200-metre individual medley, 5th in the 200-metre butterfly, 5th in the 400-metre individual medley, and 7th in the 100-metre butterfly.

At the 1976 Summer Olympics, in Montreal, she swam the 100-metre butterfly, not reaching the final.

Participated at the 1978 World Aquatics Championships in West Berlin, where she finished 11th in the 400-metre individual medley (breaking the Brazilian record), and 19th in the 200-metre individual medley.

After ending her career in swimming, she became an architect. In 2010, she was adviser to the CBDA for the design application of Rio de Janeiro become the headquarters of the 2015 World Aquatics Championships.

References

1961 births
Living people
Brazilian female butterfly swimmers
Brazilian female medley swimmers
Swimmers at the 1975 Pan American Games
Swimmers at the 1976 Summer Olympics
Swimmers at the 1979 Pan American Games
Olympic swimmers of Brazil
Swimmers from Rio de Janeiro (city)
Pan American Games bronze medalists for Brazil
Pan American Games medalists in swimming
Medalists at the 1975 Pan American Games
20th-century Brazilian women
21st-century Brazilian women